The Ankara Express is a daily overnight intercity passenger train, operated by TCDD Taşımacılık, between Istanbul and Ankara, with major stops at İzmit and Eskişehir.

There are two iterations of the Ankara Express; the first iteration began service in 1975 and departed Haydarpaşa station in Istanbul. This service was discontinued in 2014, with the completion of the Ankara-Istanbul high-speed railway. Following the opening of the Marmaray commuter rail system in 2019, the Ankara Express was brought back, departing from Halkalı station. With this re-routing, the Ankara Express became the first non-high-speed intercity train service to use the Marmaray Tunnel under the Bosphorus.

The train was operated by the Turkish State Railways between 1975 and 2014, and is currently operated by TCDD Taşımacılık since its revival in 2019.

Operations
The Ankara Express operates daily, in each direction. Both trains depart their respective origins at 22:00 (TRT).

Route Details
The Ankara Express begins its eastbound journey from Halkalı station, on the European side of Istanbul. Departing the station at 22:00, the train uses southernmost express track to bypass Marmaray commuter rail service and stations. Traveling along the southern shore of Istanbul, the Ankara Express stops at Bakırköy, before heading into the Marmaray Tunnel a few kilometers after. The train traverses the entire tunnel, without stopping at any of the stations within; transit time of the tunnel takes about 10 minutes. Using the tunnel, the train traverses the Bosphorus strait, exiting Europe and entering Asia (Anatolia).

On the Asian side, the Ankara Express exits the tunnel in Kadıköy and joins the Istanbul-Ankara railway shortly after. The next station the train calls at is Söğütlüçeşme. Connections here to the Metrobüs BRT service are available. Following the station, the train once again uses the southern express track to bypass Marmaray trains, while calling at Bostancı, Pendik and Gebze. During this stretch the Ankara Express generally passes the last YHT high-speed train of the day from Ankara, baring delays. 

After Gebze, track speed increases to  until İzmit, but generally for high-speed trains. Hugging the north shore of the Gulf of İzmit, the train travels through the heavily industrialized region west of İzmit, before reaching İzmit station shortly after midnight. 

Following İzmit, the Ankara Express continues along the Istanbul-Ankara railway, while the high-speed railway continues parallel to the line. After exiting İzmit's eastern suburbs and passing just south of Lake Sapanca, the train arrives at Arifiye, turns south and follows the Sakarya River through the Samanlı Mountains. After a brief straight section of track through the Pamukova plain, the train winds through the Katırlı Mountains until reaching Bilecik, where it has a brief stop. After Bilecik, the Ankara Express continues its climb through the Sündiken Mountains until reaching Bozüyük in the far west of the Central Anatolian Plains. 

The Ankara Express arrives in Eskişehir in the middle of the night, stopping briefly. After departing, the train continues across the Central Anatolian Plain, consisting of rolling hills. As dawn breaks, the train reaches the western outskirts of Ankara, entering Sincan in the early morning. From here, the route is once again segregated between express and local service, as the Ankara Express uses the express track to bypass Başkentray commuter rail service.  after Sincan station, the Ankara Express reaches Ankara station in central Ankara.

References

External links

 Summary of Turkish Trains
 Ankara Ekspresi

Named passenger trains of Turkey